Richard Lowther, 2nd Viscount Lonsdale (1692 – 1 December 1713) was an English nobleman, the eldest son of John Lowther, 1st Viscount Lonsdale and Katherine Thynne.

He succeeded his father at the age of eight, but died in 1713 a few months after reaching his majority.

References

1692 births
1713 deaths
Richard
2